Bocage's wall gecko (Tarentola bocagei) is a species of geckos in the family Phyllodactylidae. The species is endemic to Cape Verde, where it occurs in the island of São Nicolau. The species was first described and named in 2012. The type locality is Carriçal, in the eastern part of  São Nicolau. The species is listed as least-concern species by the IUCN.

Etymology
The specific name bocagei refers to naturalist José Vicente Barbosa du Bocage.

References

bocagei
Geckos of Africa
Endemic vertebrates of Cape Verde
Reptiles described in 2012
Fauna of São Nicolau, Cape Verde